The LA Film Festival was an annual film festival that was held in Los Angeles, California, and usually took place in June. It showcased independent, international, feature, documentary and short films, as well as web series, music videos, episodic television and panel conversations.

Since 2001, it had been run by the nonprofit Film Independent, which since 1985 has also produced the annual Independent Spirit Awards in Santa Monica. The festival began as the Los Angeles Independent Film Festival in 1995. The LAIFF ran for six years until it was absorbed into Film Independent in 2001.

History 
The first LAIFF took place over the course of five days in a single location: the historic Raleigh Studios in Hollywood. In 1996, the LAIFF expanded to include the Directors Guild of America Building in Hollywood. In 2001, the festival became part of the organization Film Independent (formerly IFP/West). In 2006, the Los Angeles Times became the festival's main media sponsor.

In 2010, the festival moved to the Regal Cinemas at the L.A. Live complex in downtown Los Angeles, with additional screenings at several other downtown venues including the Downtown Independent, the Orpheum Theatre, and the REDCAT Theatre. The Festival also has a long tradition of screenings at the open-air John Anson Ford Amphitheatre in Hollywood. Free screenings were scheduled at California Plaza, in conjunction with Grand Performances and FIGat7th.

In 2016, the LA Film Festival moved to ArcLight Cinemas in Culver City & Hollywood, California. And expanded in 2017 to ArcLight Cinemas in Santa Monica. In 2018, the LA Film Festival further expanded and added the WGA Theater as a venue. It also partnered with the Wallis Annenberg Center for the Performing Arts to screen films there.

Importance 
The LA Film Festival was a qualifying festival in all categories for Film Independent's Spirit Awards. It was also a qualifying festival for the short films categories of the Academy Awards.

Event features 
Over the course of nine days each edition, the festival screened nearly 200 features, shorts, and episodes. The event also included world premieres of films, a variety of panels, seminars, and free screenings.

It also screened short films created by high school students as a part of the Future Filmmakers program. Films submitted to the Festival were reviewed by Film Independent's programming department, which evaluated each film, looking for the best in new American and international cinema.

Notable screenings and debuts 
Sidewalks of New York, directed by Ed Burns
Things Behind the Sun, directed by Allison Anders
With a Friend Like Harry, directed by Dominik Moll
The Twilight Saga: Eclipse, directed by David Slade

Guest directors

Artists in residence

Spirit of Independence Award Recipients

Awards presented 
Awards are given out in the following categories at the conclusion of the Festival:
 US Fiction
 Documentary
 World Fiction
 Nightfall
 Short Fiction
 Short Documentary
 Audience Award for Best Fiction Film
 Audience Award for Best Documentary Film
 Audience Award for Best Episodic Story
 Audience Award for Best Short Film

References

External links 
  (LA Film Festival)
  (Film Independent)

Film festivals in Los Angeles